A focus puller or first assistant camera (1st AC) is a member of a film crew's camera department whose primary responsibility is to maintain the camera lens's optical focus on whatever subject or action is being filmed.

"Pulling focus" refers to the act of changing the camera lens's focus distance to a moving subject's distance from the focal plane, or the changing distance between a stationary object and a moving camera. For example, if an actor moves from 8 meters to 3 meters away from the focal plane within a shot, the focus puller will change the distance setting on the lens in precise relation to the changing position of the actor. Additionally, the focus puller may shift focus from one subject to another within the frame, as dictated by the requirements of the shot. This process is called "rack focusing".

Focus pulling
There is often very little room for error, depending on the parameters of a given shot. The role of a focus puller is extremely important to a film production. A "soft" image will, in most circumstances, be considered unusable, since there is no way to fix such an error in post-production. In addition, an actor may not be able to duplicate their best performance in a subsequent take, so the focus puller is expected to perform flawlessly on every take.

British cinematographer Oliver Stapleton has written:

Methodology 
Once a camera position or overall "shot" is established by the director of photography and camera operator, the 1st AC begins to measure the various distances between the actors' marks and the focal plane of the camera. These distances are recorded in a series of grease pencil or pen marks on the focus barrel of the lens; similar marks may be placed on the marking disc or ring of any follow focus device being used. Traditionally, the focus puller used only their marks and their own well-developed sense of distance estimation to achieve good results. Over the last decade, the increased use of digital cameras, higher-resolution video taps and on-camera monitors have provided focus pullers with additional tools to help maintain proper focus. A high-definition monitor can be particularly useful when a fast-paced production simply does not allow time for the focus puller to set and check all marks that may be needed, or if no rehearsal will be provided.

The 1st AC may take surveying measurements of the general environment in order to have a good idea of the distances between reference points, such as patterns on the floor or walls, furniture, and whatever else might be around. These reference measurements can be used to quickly establish rough distances between the camera and the subject in chaotic shooting circumstances.

The 1st AC reports to the director of photography, works alongside the camera operator, and oversees the 2nd assistant camera (also known as the "clapper loader") and any other members of the camera department.

References

Cinematography
Filmmaking occupations